Neilson Peak is a peak in the central part of Parmelee Massif at the head of Lehrke inlet, on the east coast of Palmer Land. It was mapped by the United States Geological Survey in 1974, and named by the Advisory Committee on Antarctic Names for David R. Neilson, a United States Antarctic Research Program biologist at Palmer Station in 1975.

Mountains of Palmer Land